Anzor Amberkovich Kavazashvili (born 19 July 1940) is a Soviet former football goalkeeper of Georgian nationality.

Honours
 Soviet Top League champion: 1965, 1969
 Soviet Cup winner: 1968, 1971
 Soviet Goalkeeper of the Year: 1965, 1967

International career
He played for Soviet Union national team (29 matches), and was a participant at the 1966 FIFA World Cup and 1970 FIFA World Cup. After ending his playing career, he worked as a coach of several teams, including Spartak Kostroma and national teams of Chad and Guinea.

References 
  RussiaTeam biography

External links
 Anzor Kavazashvili Interview

1940 births
Living people
Sportspeople from Batumi
Footballers from Georgia (country)
Soviet footballers
Soviet Top League players
FC Spartak Moscow players
FC Zenit Saint Petersburg players
FC Torpedo Moscow players
FC Dinamo Tbilisi players
FC Torpedo Kutaisi players
Football managers from Georgia (country)
Soviet football managers
Soviet expatriate football managers
1966 FIFA World Cup players
UEFA Euro 1968 players
1970 FIFA World Cup players
Association football goalkeepers
Soviet Union international footballers
Georgian people of Greek descent
Expatriate football managers in Chad
Expatriate football managers in Guinea